The green gold catfish (Corydoras melanotaenia) is a tropical freshwater fish belonging to the Corydoradinae subfamily of the family Callichthyidae.  It originates in inland waters in South America, and is found in the Meta River basin in Colombia.

The fish grows up to 2.3 in (5.8 cm) long.  It lives in a tropical climate in water with a 6.0–8.0 pH, a water hardness of 2–25 dGH, and a temperature range of 73–77 °F (23–25 °C).  It feeds on worms, benthic crustaceans, insects, and plant matter.  It lays eggs in dense vegetation and adults do not guard the eggs.  In captivity, the eggs are attached to the broad leaves of plants; the eggs hatch after five days. Usually, one spawning session produces about 150–180 eggs.

The green gold catfish is of commercial importance in the aquarium trade industry.

See also 
 List of freshwater aquarium fish species

References

External links 
 Photos at Fishbase
 Planetcatfish: Corydoras melanotaenia

Corydoras
Freshwater fish of Colombia
Fishkeeping
Fish described in 1912